In mathematics, a modular invariant of a group is an invariant of a finite group acting on a vector space of positive characteristic (usually dividing the order of the group).

Dickson invariant

When G is the finite general linear group GLn(Fq) over the finite field Fq of order a prime power q acting on the ring Fq[X1, ...,Xn] in the natural way,  found a complete set of invariants as follows. Write [e1, ..., en] for the determinant of the matrix whose entries are X, where e1, ..., en are non-negative integers. For example, the Moore determinant [0,1,2] of order 3 is

Then under the action of an element g of GLn(Fq) these determinants are all multiplied by det(g), so they are all invariants of SLn(Fq) and the ratios [e1, ...,en] / [0, 1, ..., n − 1] are invariants of GLn(Fq), called Dickson invariants.  Dickson proved that the full ring of invariants Fq[X1, ...,Xn]GLn(Fq) is a polynomial algebra over the n Dickson invariants [0, 1, ..., i − 1, i + 1, ..., n] / [0, 1, ..., n − 1] for i = 0, 1, ..., n − 1.
 gave a shorter proof of Dickson's theorem.

The matrices [e1, ..., en] are divisible by all non-zero linear forms in the variables Xi with coefficients in the finite field Fq. In particular the Moore determinant [0, 1, ..., n − 1] is a product of such linear forms, taken over  1 + q + q2 + ... + qn – 1 representatives of (n – 1)-dimensional projective space over the field. This factorization is similar to the factorization of the Vandermonde determinant into linear factors.

See also

Sanderson's theorem

References

Invariant theory